Hot Country Songs is a chart that ranks the top-performing country music songs in the United States, published by Billboard magazine.  In 1992, 25 different songs topped the chart, then published under the title Hot Country Singles & Tracks, in 52 issues of the magazine, based on weekly airplay data from country music radio stations compiled by Nielsen Broadcast Data Systems.

In early 1992, after performing with her mother in the duo The Judds since the early 1980s, Wynonna Judd, now known mononymously as Wynonna, launched her solo career and achieved immediate success.  She topped the Hot Country Singles & Tracks chart with her debut single "She Is His Only Need" and followed it up before the end of the year with two more chart-toppers with "I Saw the Light" and "No One Else on Earth".  The three songs spent a total of eight weeks at number one, the most by any act in 1992.  Alan Jackson was the only other artist to achieve three number ones during the year, but his three chart-toppers, "Dallas", "Love's Got a Hold on You" and "She's Got the Rhythm (And I Got the Blues)", spent only four weeks in total at the top of the chart.  Brooks & Dunn, Collin Raye, Garth Brooks and Vince Gill each reached number one with two songs.

In addition to Wynonna, four other artists reached number one for the first time in 1992.  Collin Raye was the first, moving into the top spot on the first chart of the year with "Love, Me".  Raye's song was replaced at number one three weeks later by Tracy Lawrence's "Sticks and Stones", another first-time chart-topper.  Aaron Tippin gained his first number one with "There Ain't Nothin' Wrong with the Radio" in April, and Billy Ray Cyrus achieved the same feat in May with "Achy Breaky Heart", which had the longest unbroken run at the top of the chart in 1992, spending five weeks at number one.  The final number one of the year was "Don't Let Our Love Start Slippin' Away" by Vince Gill.

Chart history

See also
1992 in music
List of artists who reached number one on the U.S. country chart

References

Country
1992 record charts
1992